Underdogs is the second full-length studio album by the Canadian alternative rock group Matthew Good Band, released in 1997. In a 2000 poll by music magazine Chart, Underdogs was voted the 18th Greatest Canadian album of all time.

Background
In December 1996, Matthew Good Band signed a two-album deal with Private Music. In mid-January, on the first day of pre-production for Underdogs, the group was notified that BMG Entertainment North America was merging Private Music into Windham Hill/High Street Records, putting a halt to the production of the album. In mid-March, after negotiations, Windham Hill/High Street released the group from its contract. Good was paid what he was owed for the two albums, and the group decided to record the new album regardless of label support, using the money received from the divorce of their contract with Windham Hill/High Street to fund it. According to Good, the album cost $100,000 to produce. The group then agreed to release the album under a distribution agreement with PolyGram Group Canada.

Commercial performance
Underdogs was the band's most successful album yet, being certified Platinum in Canada and being nominated for "Best Rock Album" at the 1999 Juno Awards.  By March 2003, the album had sold 200,000 units in Canada, achieving Double Platinum status.

Track listing
All words by Matthew Good, all music by Good and Dave Genn, except where noted.

Personnel

Matthew Good Band
Matthew Good - vocals, guitar, cover concept
Ian Browne - drums
Geoff Lloyd - bass guitar
Dave Genn - guitar, Keyboards
Note: Todd Kerns performs backing vocals on "Everything Is Automatic" and "Rico" (not part of MGB)

 Production
Warne Livesey - Producer, Engineer, Mixer
Frank Weipert - Manager
Dean Maher - Assistant
Zach Blackstone - Engineer
Stephen Marcussen (Precision Mastering, Los Angeles, CA) - Mastering
Legal: Jonathan Simkin
Accounting: Davidson & Co.
Don C. Tyler   - Digital editor
Leanne Petersen - Cover photos
Andrea Marouk - Additional photos
Garnet Armstrong - Album design
Manufacturer: Darktown Records
Distributor: A&M Records, a division of PolyGram Inc.

References

1997 albums
Matthew Good albums
Mercury Records albums
PolyGram albums
Albums produced by Warne Livesey
Albums recorded at Greenhouse Studios